Daum is a South Korean web portal. It offers many Internet services to web users, including a popular free web-based e-mail, messaging service, forums, shopping, news and webtoon service. The word "daum" means "next" and also "diverse voices".

Background 
The popularity of Daum stems from the range of services it offers, but also from the fact that it was the first Korean web portal of significant size. Its popularity started when it merged with the then most popular e-mail service, daum.net or hanmail.net. After the merging, Daum started the forum service Daum Cafe which brought its firm status in the market. Daum received the eighth highest trust rating in a 2020 Reuters Institute survey of selected South Korean media outlets.

History 
Korea.

From 2003, Daum started on-line direct automobile insurance by launching the subsidiary 'Daum Direct Auto Insurance' and from 2008, it became a partnership company with ERGO Insurance Group.

On August 2, 2004, Daum announced the purchase of Lycos for $95.4 million, and closed the transaction on October 6. As part of a corporate restructuring to focus on mobile, social networks and location-based services, Daum sold Lycos for $36 million in August 2010 to Ybrant Digital, an internet marketing company based in Hyderabad, India.

In 2006, they started a blogging service Tistory with 'Tatter and Company', a blogging platform developing company and in July 2007 Daum took over all rights to manage the services.

The company also develops and distributes the freeware media player PotPlayer. In addition to its freeware media player (Daum tvPot), Daum Communications Corp. provides variety of services such as clouding service (Daum Cloud), Daum Dictionary (applicable on mobile devices), Daum Comics, and map service (Daum Maps).

Daum has about 874 employees as of March, 2009 and is the 2nd largest web portal service provider in South Korea in terms of daily visits.

In 2014, Daum merged with Kakao Corp. (at that time known as Kakao Inc.), known as the maker of KakaoTalk, to form Daum Kakao.

Security warning
The e-mail address ceos1[@]daum[.]net; is currently (Jun 2019) being used by the London Blue group of
cybercriminals in a business email compromise scam.

See also

 Contemporary culture of South Korea
 Global World Encyclopedia
 Naver (corporation)
 PotPlayer
 Tistory

Notes

References

External links
 
 

Blog hosting services
Webmail
South Korean brands
South Korean websites
Internet search engines
Web portals
Kakao